The 2014 Portugal Open was a tennis tournament played on outdoor clay courts. It was the 25th edition of the Portugal Open for the men and the 18th for the women, and was part of the ATP World Tour 250 series of the 2014 ATP World Tour, and of the International-level tournaments of the 2014 WTA Tour. Both the men's and the women's events took place at the Estádio Nacional in Oeiras, Portugal, from April 26 through May 4, 2014.

Points and prize money

Point distribution

Prize money 

* per team

ATP singles main draw entrants

Seeds

 Rankings are as of April 21, 2014.

Other entrants
The following players received wildcards into the singles main draw:
  Tomáš Berdych
  Gastão Elias
  Rui Machado

The following players received entry from the qualifying draw:
  Radu Albot
  Taro Daniel
  Daniel Gimeno-Traver
  Leonardo Mayer

The following player received entry as lucky loser:
  Roberto Carballés Baena

Withdrawals
Before the tournament
  Pablo Andújar
  Santiago Giraldo
  Bradley Klahn
  Benoît Paire (knee injury)
  Édouard Roger-Vasselin
  Stanislas Wawrinka

ATP doubles main draw entrants

Seeds

 Rankings are as of April 21, 2014.

Other entrants
The following pairs received wildcards into the doubles main draw:
  Gastão Elias /  João Sousa
  Rui Machado /  Frederico Ferreira Silva

Withdrawals
Before the tournament
  Santiago Giraldo
  Marc López (left leg injury)

WTA singles main draw entrants

Seeds

 Rankings are as of April 21, 2014.

Other entrants
The following players received wildcards into the singles main draw:
  Eugenie Bouchard
  Ons Jabeur
  Maria João Koehler

The following players received entry from the qualifying draw:
  Timea Bacsinszky
  Irina-Camelia Begu
  Alla Kudryavtseva
  Kristina Mladenovic

Withdrawals
Before the tournament
  Sorana Cîrstea --> replaced by Urszula Radwańska
  Alizé Cornet (adductor strain) --> replaced by Yanina Wickmayer
  Daniela Hantuchová --> replaced by Polona Hercog
  Klára Koukalová --> replaced by Yaroslava Shvedova
  Maria Kirilenko --> replaced by Karin Knapp
  Varvara Lepchenko --> replaced by Monica Puig
  Anastasia Pavlyuchenkova --> replaced by Alexandra Cadanțu
  Alison Riske --> replaced by Stefanie Vögele
  Francesca Schiavone --> replaced by Barbora Záhlavová-Strýcová

WTA doubles main draw entrants

Seeds

 Rankings are as of April 21, 2014.

Other entrants
The following pairs received wildcards into the doubles main draw:
  Maria João Koehler /  María Teresa Torró Flor
  Ekaterina Lopes /  Bárbara Luz

Withdrawals
During the tournament
  María Teresa Torró Flor (left harmstring injury)

Finals

Men's singles

  Carlos Berlocq defeated  Tomáš Berdych, 0–6, 7–5, 6–1

Women's singles

  Carla Suárez Navarro defeated  Svetlana Kuznetsova, 6–4, 3–6, 6–4

Men's doubles

  Santiago González /  Scott Lipsky defeated  Pablo Cuevas /  David Marrero, 6–3, 3–6, [10–8]

Women's doubles

  Cara Black /  Sania Mirza defeated  Eva Hrdinová /  Valeria Solovyeva, 6–4, 6–3

References

External links
 Official website